The 2010 Supercoppa Italiana was the 23rd Supercoppa Italiana, an annual football match contested by the winners of the previous season's Serie A and Coppa Italia competitions. The match was played at the San Siro on 21 August 2010, and contested by league and cup double winners Internazionale and cup runners-up Roma. The Supercoppa Italiana is usually contested by the winners of the Serie A and the Coppa Italia, but since Internazionale won both the competitions, Roma were their opponents. Internazionale won the title 3–1.

Match details 

{| style="width:100%; font-size:90%"
|-
| style="width:50%; vertical-align:top"|
MAN OF THE MATCH
 Samuel Eto'o (Internazionale)

See also 
2009–10 Serie A
2009–10 Coppa Italia

References 

2010
Inter Milan matches
A.S. Roma matches
2010–11 in Italian football cups